Pittsylvania County is a county located in the Commonwealth of Virginia. As of the 2020 United States Census, the population was 60,501. Chatham is the county seat.

Pittsylvania County is included in the Danville, VA Micropolitan Statistical Area.

The largest undeveloped uranium deposit in the United States (7th largest in the world) is located in Pittsylvania County. (see Uranium mining in Virginia.)

History
Originally "Pittsylvania" was a name suggested for an unrealized British colony to be located primarily in what is now West Virginia. Pittsylvania County would not have been within this proposed colony, which subsequently was named Vandalia.

Pittsylvania County was formed in 1767 with territory annexed from Halifax County. It was named for William Pitt, 1st Earl of Chatham, who served as Prime Minister of Great Britain from 1766 to 1768, and who opposed some harsh colonial policies of the period.

In 1777 the western part of Pittsylvania County was partitioned off to became Patrick Henry County.

Maud Clement's History of Pittsylvania County notes the following:
"Despite the settlers' intentions, towns failed to develop for two reasons: the generally low level of economic activity in the area and the competition from plantation settlements already providing the kind of marketing and purchasing services typically offered by a town. Plantation settlements along the rivers, particularly at ferrying points, became commercial centers. The most important for early Pittsylvania was that of Sam Pannill, a Scots-Irishman, who at the end of the eighteenth century, while still a young man, set up a plantation town at Green Hill on the north side of the Staunton River in Campbell County. (Clement 15)

"Its economy was tobacco-dominated and reliant on a growing slave labor force. It was a county without towns or a commercial center.  Plantation villages on the major river thoroughfares were the only centers of trade, until the emergence of Danville. (Clement 23)"

The city of Danville's history up through the antebellum period overall is an expression of the relationship between the town and the planters who influenced its development.

Geography

It is the largest county in Virginia by land area and second-largest by total area. The county is bounded on the north by the Roanoke River (this stretch of the river is known as the Staunton River), bisected by the Banister River running eastward through the center, and is drained on the south by the Dan River, flowing eastward.

Districts
The county is divided into seven districts:

 Banister
 Callands-Gretna
 Chatham-Blairs
 Dan River
 Staunton River
 Tunstall
 Westover

Adjacent counties and cities
Virginia Counties
 Bedford County - Northwest (across Smith Mountain Lake)
 Campbell County - North/Northeast
 Franklin County - West/Northwest
 Halifax County - East
 Henry County - West/Southwest
 Danville (independent city within borders of Pittsylvania County) - South

North Carolina Counties
 Caswell County, North Carolina - South/Southeast
 Rockingham County, North Carolina - South/Southwest

Major highways

Demographics

2020 census

Note: the US Census treats Hispanic/Latino as an ethnic category. This table excludes Latinos from the racial categories and assigns them to a separate category. Hispanics/Latinos can be of any race.

2010 Census
According to the 2010 United States Census, there are 60,949 people, and 26,687 households in the county. The population density was 65.5 people per square mile (25/km²). There were 31,656 housing units at an average density of 32 per square mile (12/km²). The racial makeup of the county was 76.20% White, 21.50% Black or African American, 0.30% Native American, 0.50% Asian, 0.37% from other races, and 1.40% from two or more races. 2.70% of the population were Hispanic or Latino of any race.

There were 26,687 households, out of which 30.40% had children under the age of 18 living with them. The average household size was 2.28 and the average family size was 2.93.

The median income for a household in the county was $44,356. The per capita income for the county was $23,597. About 12.60% of the population were below the poverty line.

Government
Pittsylvania County is governed by an elected seven-member Board of Supervisors. Management of the County is vested in a Board-appointed County Administrator.

There are also five elected Constitutional Officers:
 Clerk of the Circuit Court: Mark Scarce (I)
 Commonwealth's Attorney: Robert Bryan Haskins (R)
 Sheriff: Michael "Mike" Taylor (I)
 Commissioner of Revenue: Robin Goard (I)
 Treasurer: Vincent Shorter (I)

Communities

Incorporated Towns
 Chatham
 Gretna
 Hurt

Census-designated places
 Blairs
 Motley
 Mount Hermon

Other unincorporated communities

 Ajax
 Bachelors Hall
 Banister
 Beaver Park
 Brosville
 Brights
 Brutus
 Buford
 Callahans Hills
 Callands
 Cartersville
 Cascade
 Cedar Forest
 Cedar Hill
 Chalk Level
 Climax
 Coles Hill
 Dry Fork
 Dundee
 Ebenezer
 Flint Hill
 Galveston
 Glenland
 Grady
 Green Acres
 Green Pond
 Greenfield
 Grit
 Henrys Mill
 Hermosa
 Hill Grove
 Hinesville
 Hollywood
 Hopewell
 Java
 Keeling
 Kentuck
 Lakewood
 Laniers Mill
 Laurel Grove
 Leaksville Junction
 Level Run
 Lucks
 Markham
 Motleys Mill
 Mount Airy
 Mount Cross
 Mountain Hill
 Museville
 Natal
 Peytonsburg
 Pickaway
 Pickerel
 Pittsville
 Pleasant Gap
 Pleasant Grove
 Pullens
 Ray
 Red Oak Hollow
 Redeye
 Renan
 Riceville
 Ridgeway
 Ringgold
 Rondo
 Sandy River
 Sharon
 Sheva
 Shockoe
 Soapstone
 Sonans
 Spring Garden
 Stony Mill
 Straightstone
 Sutherlin
 Swansonville
 Sycamore
 Tightsqueeze
 Toshes
 Transco Village
 Weal
 West Fork
 Whitfield
 Whitmell
 Whittles
 Witt
 Woodlake Park
 Woodlawn
 Worlds
 Vance
 Vandola

See also
 List of Virginia counties
 National Register of Historic Places listings in Pittsylvania County, Virginia
 Uranium mining in the USA, Virginia

References

External links
 Pittsylvania County Official Website
 WMDV TV44/Danville

 
Virginia counties
1767 establishments in Virginia
Danville, Virginia micropolitan area
Populated places established in 1767